Gary Hyde (birth registered first ¼ 1960) is an English former professional rugby league footballer who played in the 1970s, 1980s and 1990s.

Background
Gary Hyde's birth was registered in Pontefract district, West Riding of Yorkshire, England.

Playing career

Challenge Cup Final appearances
Gary Hyde played left-, i.e. number 4, in Castleford's 15–14 victory over Hull Kingston Rovers in the 1986 Challenge Cup Final during the 1985–86 season at Wembley Stadium, London on Saturday 3 May 1986.

County Cup Final appearances
Gary Hyde played left-, i.e. number 4, in Castleford's 10–5 victory over Bradford Northern in the 1981 Yorkshire County Cup Final during the 1981–82 season at Headingley Rugby Stadium, Leeds, on Saturday 3 October 1981, played left-, i.e. number 4, (replaced by interchange/substitute Ian Orum) in the 2–13 defeat by Hull F.C. in the 1983 Yorkshire County Cup Final during the 1983–84 season at Elland Road, Leeds, on Saturday 15 October 1983, played left-, i.e. number 4, in the 18–22 defeat by Hull Kingston Rovers in the 1985 Yorkshire County Cup Final during the 1985–86 season at Headingley Rugby Stadium, Leeds, on Sunday 27 October 1985, played , i.e. number 5, (replaced by interchange/substitute Gary Lord) in the 31–24 victory over Hull F.C. in the 1986 Yorkshire County Cup Final during the 1986–87 season at Headingley Rugby Stadium, Leeds, on Saturday 11 October 1986, played  in the 12–12 draw with Bradford Northern in the 1987 Yorkshire County Cup Final during the 1987–88 season at Headingley Rugby Stadium, Leeds, on Saturday 17 October 1987, played  in the 2–11 defeat by Bradford Northern in the 1987 Yorkshire County Cup Final replay during the 1987–88 season at Elland Road, Leeds, on Saturday 31 October 1987, and played right-, i.e. number 3, and scored a goal in Oldham's 16–24 defeat by Warrington in the 1989 Lancashire County Cup Final during the 1989–90 season at Knowsley Road, St. Helens on Saturday 14 October 1989.

Club career
Hyde made his début for Castleford in the 22–10 victory over Huddersfield on Sunday 19 November 1978.

References

External links
Statistics at orl-heritagetrust.org.uk
Gary Hyde Memory Box Search at archive.castigersheritage.com

1960 births
Living people
Castleford Tigers players
English rugby league players
Oldham R.L.F.C. players
Rugby league centres
Rugby league players from Pontefract
Yorkshire rugby league team players